Iowa Falls is a city in Hardin County, Iowa, United States. Iowa Falls is the home of Ellsworth Community College. It is also a regional transportation center, located along U.S. Routes 20 and 65 and the Canadian National and Union Pacific Railroads. The population was 5,106 at the time of the 2020 census. A landmark in the city is its movie theater.  Built as the Metropolitan Opera House in 1899, it presented plays, operas, and vaudeville in the town during the first half of the twentieth century, and today is listed on the National Register of Historic Places.

History
Iowa Falls was laid out and platted in 1856. It was named from the falls on the Iowa River.

The Illinois Central Railroad was built through Iowa Falls in 1866.

Geography
Iowa Falls is located at  (42.5221, -93.2673).

The falls themselves were also known as the "rapids of the Iowa." The falls are now submerged by a dam built in 1926 that is  feet high and 200 feet long and serves a hydroelectric power station that currently generates 1.5MW.

Climate

According to the Köppen Climate Classification system, Iowa Falls has a hot-summer humid continental climate, abbreviated "Dfa" on climate maps.

Demographics

2010 census
At the 2010 census there were 5,238 people, 2,207 households, and 1,295 families living in the city. The racial makup of the city was 94.0% White, 2.7% African American, 0.4% Native American, 0.7% Asian, 1.0% from other races, and 1.1% from two or more races. Hispanic or Latino of any race were 3.9%.

Of the 2,207 households 26.8% had children under the age of 18 living with them, 44.0% were married couples living together, 10.6% had a female householder with no husband present, 4.1% had a male householder with no wife present, and 41.3% were non-families. 37.1% of households were one person and 18.9% were one person aged 65 or older. The average household size was 2.17 and the average family size was 2.81.

The median age was 40.9 years. 21.2% of residents were under the age of 18; 12.6% were between the ages of 18 and 24; 20.2% were from 25 to 44; 23.6% were from 45 to 64; and 22.4% were 65 or older. The gender makeup of the city was 48.2% male and 51.8% female.

2000 census
At the 2000 census there were 5,193 people, 2,215 households, and 1,331 families living in the city. The racial makup of the city was 97.34% White, 1.21% African American, 0.15% Native American, 0.33% Asian, 0.42% from other races, and 0.54% from two or more races. Hispanic or Latino of any race were 1.04%.

Of the 2,215 households 25.4% had children under the age of 18 living with them, 48.9% were married couples living together, 8.3% had a female householder with no husband present, and 39.9% were non-families. 34.6% of households were one person and 18.5% were one person aged 65 or older. The average household size was 2.19 and the average family size was 2.81.

The age distribution was20.3% under the age of 18, 13.0% from 18 to 24, 22.2% from 25 to 44, 21.5% from 45 to 64, and 23.1% that were 65 or older. The median age was 41 years. For every 100 females, there were 89.5 males. For every 100 females age 18 and over, there were 85.0 males.

The median household income was $32,141 and the median family income  was $42,279. Males had a median income of $31,216 versus $21,004 for females. The per capita income for the city was $18,330. About 7.1% of families and 10.0% of the population were below the poverty line, including 12.5% of those under age 18 and 8.3% of those age 65 or over.

Radio stations
KIFG (Iowa River Radio) 95.3 FM, 1510 AM

Education
Iowa Falls Community School District operates public schools.

Cable broadcasting

An over-the-air cable system existed in Iowa Falls, similar to one in Iron Mountain, Michigan. A list of channels and what they rebroadcast:

Notable people
 Nick Collison, NBA basketball player
 Joseph Gomer, Tuskegee airman
 Kurt Ploeger, former NFL player
 Bill Riley Sr., television personality
 Randy Schultz former NFL player
 Jim Trickey, football player
 Christopher Whitesell, writer
 Jim Whitesell, basketball coach
 John Whitesell, Hollywood director
 Patrick Whitesell, Hollywood agent and co-CEO of WME Entertainment
 Sean Whitesell, actor, writer, producer

See also
National Register of Historic Places listings in Hardin County, Iowa
St. Matthew's by the Bridge Episcopal Church
Metropolitan Opera House (Iowa Falls, Iowa)

References

External links

 City website

 
Cities in Iowa
Cities in Hardin County, Iowa
1856 establishments in Iowa